is a train station  in the town of Sakuho, Minamisaku District, Nagano Prefecture, Japan, operated by East Japan Railway Company (JR East).

Lines
Takaiwa Station is served by the Koumi Line and is 51.7 kilometers from the terminus of the line at Kobuchizawa Station.

Station layout
The station consists of one ground-level side platform serving a single bi-directional track.  The station is unattended.

History
Takaiwa Station opened on 11 March 1919.  With the privatization of Japanese National Railways (JNR) on 1 April 1987, the station came under the control of JR East. On 19 December 1995, the station building burned down in an act of arson and was replaced with a log cabin structure in 1996.

Surrounding area
Chikuma River
Koumi High School

See also
 List of railway stations in Japan

References

External links

 JR East station information 

Railway stations in Nagano Prefecture
Railway stations in Japan opened in 1919
Stations of East Japan Railway Company
Koumi Line
Sakuho, Nagano